Poseidon Undersea Resorts was a proposed chain of underwater five-star resorts that was first slated to open by September 2008.  The first was to be located on a private island in Fiji. The project was to be the world's first permanent one-atmosphere seafloor structure.

Concept 
Poseidon was conceived and developed by L. Bruce Jones, president of U.S. Submarines, Inc.

Location
The proposed location was Katafanga Island in Fiji. With a design concept in mind, Jones needed to find an appropriate location.  To help find it, Jones offered a $10,000 reward for anybody that came up with the perfect location for the venture.  After taking the suggestion of a business associate, who recommended a reef off Eleuthera, an island in the Bahamas, negotiations began with the island's American owners.  The negotiations did not go well, and after a year of failed back-and-forth offers the location was scrapped and sights were set off Fiji.

Features
The resort was to feature twenty-four  guest rooms, an underwater restaurant and bar, a library, conference room, wedding chapel, spa and a  luxury suite.  
Reservations at the resort were to be priced at $30,000 per couple per week.

See also
 Jules Undersea Lodge
 Utter Inn
 Underwater habitat

References

External links
U.S. Submarines, Inc.
Poseidon Undersea Resorts
Sat Image of possible site of the first hotel location (not correct location)
Poseidon Undersea Resort in Italiano

Poseidon Resorts
Underwater habitats
Proposed buildings and structures in Oceania